Neuraxis is a Canadian technical death metal band formed in Montreal in 1994 by Steven Henry, Yan Thiel, Michel Brisebois and Felipe Ángel Quinzanos. They have released six studio albums: Imagery (1997), A Passage into Forlorn (2001), Truth Beyond... (2002), Trilateral Progression (2005), The Thin Line Between (2008), and Asylon (2011).

In 2007, the band participated in the Domination Tour alongside Rotting Christ, Incantation and Malevolent Creation. After touring, the band released a live album entitled Live Progression. Neuraxis participated in the Montreal Assault Tour with Despised Icon, Beneath the Massacre, Carnifex and Plasmarifle to promote their album The Thin Line Between.

The band released their sixth studio album, Asylon, on February 15, 2011.

Members

Current 
 Rob Milley – guitar (1996–present)
 Alex Leblanc – vocals (2007–present)
 Olivier Pinard – bass (2009–present)
 Oli Beaudoin – drums (2009–present)

Former 

 Vocals
 Maynard Moore (Plasmarifle) (1995–1999)
 Chris Alsop (Torn Within) (1999)
 Ian Campbell (Descend into Nothingness) (1999–2007)
 Michel Brisebois (Agony) (1994-1995)

 Guitar
 Felipe A. Quinzanos (1994–1996)
 Steven Henry (Urban Aliens, Empathy Denied, Idiotpathetics) (1994–2006)
 Will Seghers (2006–2010)

 Bass
 Yan Thiel (Exult) (1994–2009)

 Drums
 Mathieu Royal (1995–1998)
 Alex Erian (Despised Icon) (1999–2003)
 Tommy McKinnon (Humanoid) (2004–2009)

 Session musicians
 Etienne Gallo (Augury, Negativa) – drums (2003–2004)
 Martin Auger – drums (1999)
 Julien Mercier – drums (1998)

Timeline

Discography

Studio albums
 Imagery (1997)
 A Passage into Forlorn (2001)
 Truth Beyond... (2002)
 Trilateral Progression (2005)
 The Thin Line Between (2008)
 Asylon (2011)

Live albums
 Live Progression (2007)

Compilations
 Imagery/A Passage into Forlorn (2004)
 Truth Beyond.../Imagery/A Passage into Forlorn (2004)

Demos
 In Silence (1999)
 Virtuosity (1999)

References

External links
 Neuraxis 

Canadian death metal musical groups
Canadian melodic death metal musical groups
Canadian technical death metal musical groups
Musical groups established in 1994
Musical groups from Montreal
Earache Records artists
Musical quintets